Cheap Pearls and Whisky Dreams – The Best of is a compilation album by Scottish band Love and Money, released by Fontana in 1999.

Critical reception

On its release, Neil McKay of Sunday Life wrote, "A vehicle for the classy songwriting of James Grant, Love and Money made some fine soul and country tinged pop rock over the course of four albums spanning the late 80s and early 90s." Nick Duerden of Q noted the band's shift from their initial image as "Scotland's latest rock hopes" to "a cult act whose heart-on-sleeve approach often went against mainstream tastes" after Grant discovered "jazz, subtlety, and artful contemplation". He described Grant as being "blessed with the lyricism of a poet" and added it was a "shame" that the band "only ever reached a tiny audience".

Track listing

Personnel
Production
 Gary Katz – producer (1, 5, 8, 10, 12)
 Steve Nye – producer (2, 7, 14)
 Tom Dowd – producer (3, 11)
 Love and Money – producer (4, 6, 9, 13, 15, 17)
 Tony Phillips – producer (4)
 Andy Taylor – producer (16)
 Paul McGeechan – mastering

Other
 Paul McGeechan, Paul Reidy – compilers
 Adrian Thrills – sleeve notes
 M4 Design – sleeve design

References

Love and Money (band) albums
1999 greatest hits albums
Fontana Records compilation albums